Superman Returns (Music from the Motion Picture) is the soundtrack album for the 2006 film of the same name. The score is composed by John Ottman, interpolating music by John Williams, particularly "Superman March" from the Superman: The Movie.

Originally, director Bryan Singer contacted Williams on scoring the film, but Williams declined due to being busy scoring Star Wars Episode III: Revenge of the Sith and Steven Spielberg's War of the Worlds.

In 2013, La-La Land Records released a 2-disc limited edition of the soundtrack with an expanded track list.

Track listing

Tracks do not appear in the order that they occur in the film, but instead in a succession chosen by Ottman for listening purposes. Listeners interested in hearing the selections in score order may program the album thus: 1, 7, 2, 3, 8, 5, 4 (to 1:02), 6, 9, 10, 11, 4 (from 1:02), 13, 14, 12, 15.

Limited Edition
La-La Land Records released a 2-disc Limited Edition album of the complete score to Superman Returns in commemoration of the 75th anniversary of Superman in December 2013.

§ Contains Superman Themes Composed and Conducted By John Williams
* Previously unreleased
** Contains previously unreleased material
† Contains material not used in film

Music not included in the soundtrack
There are several famous songs featured in the film but not included on the soundtrack album, which concentrated on the original score composed and conducted by John Ottman with themes from Williams' score for the original 1978 film.

According to the timeline they appear in the movie, the source music included:
 From 00:11:25 to 00:12:30, "The Flower Duet" from the opera "Lakmé" by Léo Delibes is used when Katherine "Kitty" Kowalski says Lex Luthor's friends are giving her creeps and Lex Luthor tells the story of Prometheus.
 From 00:47:36 to 00:47:54, The Drifters' rendering of the English version of Quando Quando Quando is featured when Clark Kent gestures to Lois Lane in a jam-packed elevator.
 From 00:50:50 to 00:52:08, the instrumental version of "Heart & Soul" by Frank Loesser and Hoagy Carmichael was performed by Jason when Superman overhears the conversation between Richard White and Lois Lane outside their house.
 From 01:04:52 to 01:05:41, "Spring" from Antonio Vivaldi's violin concerto "The Four Seasons" is featured when Katherine "Kitty" Kowalski is going to slap Lex Luthor for his cutting off her car's brake. The music is performed by the Budapest String Quartet.
 From 01:20:50 to 01:22:14, the aria "Habanera" from the opera Carmen by Georges Bizet is featured when Lois Lane investigates Lex Luthor's yacht. The music is performed by the Hollywood Studio Symphony.
 From 01:23:00 to 01:24:28, the 2nd movement called "Andante in F major" from Mozart's Piano Concerto No. 21 in C major K 467 is used when Lex Luthor "agrees" to Lois Lane's interview. The music is performed by The Concentus Hungaricus.

Chart positions

References

2006 soundtrack albums
Film scores
Superman soundtracks
Warner Records soundtracks
Superman (1978 film series)